There are six national parks in the Kingdom of Denmark; five in Denmark proper and one in Greenland.

The first national park in Denmark proper was Thy National Park, created in 2008. It is located in Thisted Municipality, Nordjylland. The park is a narrow stretch of land along the North Jutlandic Island's west coast from Hanstholm southward to Agger Tange, excluding Hanstholm, Klitmøller, Nørre Vorupør, Stenbjerg and Agger. Thy National Park is named after Thy, an area that includes not only today's national park but also adjacent land further east. The park has dunes, heath, forests and grassland and also covers several small lakes and a small part of the Limfjord, which is the fjord that separates the North Jutlandic Island from the Cimbrian Peninsula.

In August 2009, the second national park Mols Bjerge National Park was inaugurated, followed by Wadden Sea National Park in October 2010, and Land of the Scylding National Park in 2015. Two additional areas in mainland Denmark were proposed in 2008 and 2009 to become national parks. One of these plans, Skjern Å Nationalpark (after the river of the same name), was abandoned in 2012, but it was restarted in 2018 and is ongoing. The other, Kongernes Nordsjælland National Park, was inaugurated in 2018.

In 2020, work began on establishing nature national parks. These will strictly be on land owned by the Danish state, unlike the ordinary national parks where some parts are on private and municipal land. This gives the state greater control over the full area in the nature national parks and allows greater protection of the nature. Fifteen nature national parks are planned, including five that are part of the original national parks (Gribskov within Kongernes Nordsjælland National Park, Hellerup Forest and Teglstrup Hegn within Kongernes Nordsjælland National Park, Bidstrup Forests within Land of the Scylding National Park, Mols Bjerge within Mols Bjerge National Park, and Hanstholm within Thy National Park).

Greenland has had its own national park since 1974. The Northeast Greenland National Park stretches across three fifths of the northern parts of Greenland's east coast and, since its expansion in 1988, two thirds of the eastern parts of Greenland's north coast. Bounded by the coasts, the park covers the island's entire north-eastern quarter, all of which is almost uninhabited. 

Like Greenland, the Faroe Islands forms another autonomous region of the Kingdom of Denmark, but contains no national parks.

Footnotes
Notes

References

External links 
 Danish Forest and Nature Agency's website on the national parks of mainland Denmark

 
 
Denmark
National parks
National parks